Dark Side of the Mule is a live album by Gov't Mule composed of covers of Pink Floyd songs. The album was recorded in 2008 during a three-hour gig at Boston's Orpheum Theatre on Halloween night. The title is a pun on The Dark Side of the Moon, the 1973 Pink Floyd album. One of the background singers, Durga McBroom, also toured with Pink Floyd and appears on their two most recent albums.

Release 
Dark Side of the Mule was released as both a single CD and deluxe three-CD/DVD set.

Track listing

Dark Side of the Mule (Standard Edition)

Dark Side of the Mule (Deluxe Edition)

Personnel 
 Warren Haynes – vocals, guitar
 Matt Abts – drums
 Danny Louis – keyboards
 Jorgen Carlsson – bass
 Ron Holloway – Saxophone
 Durga McBroom – Background Vocals
 Sophia Ramos – Background Vocals
 Machan Taylor – Background Vocals

References 

Gov't Mule albums
2014 albums
Tributes to The Dark Side of the Moon